Jonathan Ferrari (born 5 May 1985), is an Argentinian professional footballer who plays for All Boys.

Honours

Club
Dalian Yifang
China League One: 2017

Notes

References

External links

1987 births
Living people
Argentine footballers
Argentine expatriate footballers
Association football defenders
All Boys footballers
San Lorenzo de Almagro footballers
Atlético de Rafaela footballers
Rosario Central footballers
Club Atlético Patronato footballers
Esporte Clube Vitória players
Dalian Professional F.C. players
Sportivo Luqueño players
C.D. Olimpia players
L.D.U. Portoviejo footballers
Argentine Primera División players
Primera Nacional players
Liga Nacional de Fútbol Profesional de Honduras players
China League One players
Paraguayan Primera División players
Ecuadorian Serie A players
Argentine expatriate sportspeople in Brazil
Argentine expatriate sportspeople in China
Argentine expatriate sportspeople in Paraguay
Argentine expatriate sportspeople in Honduras
Argentine expatriate sportspeople in Ecuador
Expatriate footballers in Brazil
Expatriate footballers in China
Expatriate footballers in Paraguay
Expatriate footballers in Honduras
Expatriate footballers in Ecuador
Footballers from Buenos Aires